Howard Zinn: You Can't Be Neutral on a Moving Train is a 2004 documentary film narrated by Matt Damon about the life and times of historian, activist and author Howard Zinn and his involvement in some of the most important social movements of the past fifty years. The film was directed by Deb Ellis and Denis Mueller.

Release
Between June and December, 2004 the film had a nationwide theatrical release, playing in over 50 cities across the country. In November 2004 the film was "short-listed" for an Academy Award, and in 2005 the film was released on DVD.

Critical reception
The film has a 97% fresh rating by critics on Rotten Tomatoes.

In 2008, the film was chosen by the Zinn Education Project (a collaboration of two national organizations, Rethinking Schools and Teaching for Change) to be included in an education package sent to 4000 high school and junior high school teachers across the country.

 "Deb Ellis and Denis Mueller’s tight and deceptively low-key documentary lets the subject eloquently speak for himself".  Lou Lumenick, New York Post
 "A concise primer that should well satisfy those with a casual interest in his career".  Frank Scheck, The Hollywood Reporter.
 "A thinker and an educator, Zinn has led a life of commitment and compassion and the film offers a loving tribute".  Steven Rea, Philadelphia Inquirer
 "Finally, a documentary about one of America’s most important academics".  Jonathan Curiel, San Francisco Chronicle

Translation and International Distribution 
 Germany, Fall 2007  Howard Zinn: You Can't Be Neutral on a Moving Train - Eine amerikanische Lebensgeschichte, Published by Schwarzer Freitag, Berlin, Germany http://schwarzerfreitag.com/de/, 2007
 Non puoi essere neutrale quando il treno si muove, Lumière Group Multimediale, Rome, Italy, 2008

In 2010, a new Commemorative DVD with an extra hour of bonus materials was released by First Run Features.

Cast 
In alphabetical order:
 Daniel Berrigan
 Clayborne Carson
 Oscar Chase
 Noam Chomsky
 Jay Craven
 Matt Damon (narrator)
 Marian Wright Edelman
 Daniel Ellsberg
 Tom Hayden
 Staughton Lynd
 Bob Moses
 Ray Mungo
 Frances Fox Piven
 David Rovics
 Cleveland Sellers
 John Silber
 Alice Walker
 Howard Zinn

References

External links

Howard Zinn: You Can't Be Neutral on a Moving Train - Commemorative Edition

2004 films
American documentary films
Biographical films about writers
First Run Features films
2000s English-language films
2000s American films